The Church of St Mary at Temple, Corsley, Wiltshire, England is a chapel-of-ease dating from the very early 20th century. It was commissioned and paid for by Mary Barton, of Corsley House, in memory of her husband and son. Designed in the Arts and Crafts style, the church is now in the care of the Friends of Friendless Churches. It is a Grade II listed building.

History and description
The Bartons had owned land at Corsley since the 18th century, and built Corsley House in a Neoclassical style in 1814. In her will of 1899, Mary Barton left £10,000 to establish the Barton Trust, which was to build a church in memory of her husband and son. A little less than half the amount was spent on construction, with the remainder being invested to maintain the church and pay for the holding of services. In the 21st century St Mary's was declared a redundant church and passed into the care of the Friends of Friendless Churches.

The Wiltshire Pevsner describes the church as "Arts and Crafts Gothic" in style. It is constructed of limestone with a tiled roof and has a gabled porch and small bell-cote.

References

Sources
 

Grade II listed churches in Wiltshire
Gothic Revival church buildings in England
Gothic Revival architecture in Wiltshire
Churches preserved by the Friends of Friendless Churches